Benjamin Silva is an Indian politician. He was elected to the Goa Legislative Assembly from Velim in the 2012 Goa Legislative Assembly election as an Independent member.

References

Year of birth missing (living people)
Living people
Members of the Goa Legislative Assembly
People from South Goa district
Goa MLAs 2012–2017
Independent politicians in India
Trinamool Congress politicians from Goa